Llanfairpwll railway station is a station on the North Wales Coast Line from Crewe to , serving the village of Llanfairpwllgwyngyll, Anglesey.

History
Opened in 1848 it was initially the terminus of the line from Holyhead before the opening of the Britannia Bridge to the mainland in 1850. It suffered a catastrophic fire on 13 November 1865 and had to be completely re-constructed. It was again closed in 1972 and subsequently reopened again 1973 with both wooden platforms (the only one on the island), which was refurbished in 2017 and the signal box remain from the original configuration, but converted into a gate keeper's box, meaning no junctions or signals are controlled from there, except for gate locking. However, a turntable, sidings and goods yard have disappeared, the latter two under a car park.

The station is known for its longer name, Llanfairpwllgwyngyllgogerychwyrndrobwllllantysiliogogogoch, but this is a Victorian contrivance for the benefit of tourists with no basis in historical usage. It comprises the full name of the village, plus local topographical details, plus the name of a neighbouring church etc. The actual longest railway station name in Wales (indeed the UK) is Rhoose Cardiff International Airport railway station.

Coronavirus 
The railway station officially reopened for service on the 21st of August 2021. Between 8th July 2020 and 21st August 2021 trains did not call at the station; Transport for Wales stated that during the 2019-20 coronavirus pandemic the short platform and the inability to maintain social distancing between passengers and the guard when opening the train door was the reason. Trains stopped at the platform, with Class 153, 150, 158 and 175 serving the station many times before the closure. People were complaining on Transport for Wales' social media about the decision, and letters and emails were sent to local councillors and Member of the Senedd Rhun ap Iorwerth, with a petition created on the Welsh Parliament website to support the frustration.  

Passengers were left with no choice but to travel to Bangor railway station by bus or taxi, which is 5 miles away from Llanfairpwll: there were no rail replacement services serving the station unless engineering works were taking place, but passengers with bicycles had to cycle to other stations to use the trains. On 11 August 2021 it was announced that the station would re-open. Local Member of the Senedd Rhun ap Iorwerth criticised the length of the closure stating, "I still can't understand why there couldn't have been a way to open it safely before now, and I've made my frustration clear, but better late than never."

Facilities
The station is unstaffed and has no ticket provision - these must be bought on the train or prior to travel. Waiting shelters are provided on each platform and train running details offered via timetable posters and digital information screens (as can be seen from the accompanying station photograph). The station is not listed as accessible for mobility-impaired and wheelchair users on the National Rail Enquiries website.

During April 2017, the upgrade of the footbridge was completed as part of Network Rail's Railway Upgrade Plan. The footbridge, which is over 100 years old, was temporarily removed earlier in the year, to undergo a £395,000 upgrade, including specialist refurbishment and repairs at the Centregreat Rail workshop in Cardiff.

Services 

Trains used to stop in each direction. These are Transport for Wales Rail services between Holyhead and Chester via . On Mondays to Saturdays, 9 services operates to Holyhead and 13 towards Chester. On Sundays, services are reduced to 6 towards Holyhead and 7 towards Chester.

As a result, only one door on Transport for Wales intercity services is unlocked by the conductor/guard for passengers (Except for the BR classes 150/2 and 153 which occasionally visits Holyhead.)

See also 
Rhoose Cardiff International Airport railway station – the station with the longest officially used name in Great Britain.
Gorsafawddacha'idraigodanheddogleddollônpenrhynareurdraethceredigion – a station name contrived to be longer than Llanfairpwll
Longest place names in the English language

References

Further reading

External links 

 Slater's Directory of North & Mid Wales, 1895 uses all three of the short names for the village – and does not mention the long form.
Video footage of Llanfair PG Railway Station

Railway stations in Anglesey
DfT Category F2 stations
Former London and North Western Railway stations
Railway stations in Great Britain opened in 1848
Railway stations in Great Britain closed in 1966
Railway stations in Great Britain opened in 1970
Railway stations in Great Britain closed in 1972
Railway stations in Great Britain opened in 1973
Beeching closures in Wales
Reopened railway stations in Great Britain
Railway stations served by Transport for Wales Rail
Railway request stops in Great Britain
Llanfairpwllgwyngyll